Kithira Island National Airport "Alexandros Aristotelous Onassis" is an airport in Kithira, Greece . The airport was renovated in 1998 and the terminal and control tower were rebuilt. Olympic Air operates scheduled flights to Athens several times a week, while charter flights are common in the summer.
Sky Express, a domestic Greek Airline offers three flights per week to Corfu, via Zakynthos, Kefalonia and Preveza.
Travel to Kythira by airplane is considered the most reliable method of transportation to the island since it is less affected by the strong winds that prevent ferry boat transit. The airport opened in 1972.

Airlines and destinations
The following airlines operate regular scheduled and charter flights at Kithira Island Airport:

Statistics

See also
Transport in Greece

References

 Kithira National Airport "Alexandros Aristotelous Onassis"

External links 

Airports in Greece
Kythira
Transport infrastructure in Attica